Italian Week, or "Settimana Italiana", is an official Italian Government initiative founded in 2007, and running for 11 years until 2017, Italian Week occurred annually between 26 May and 2 June across Queensland. The not for profit festival was one of the largest multicultural events in Australia with events attracting over 65,000 people. The festival supported the ‘Hear and Say Centre’ for children born deaf.

Italian Week was the brainchild of Cav. Alessandro Sorbello, Executive Producer and researcher, as an experiment in social and cultural identification.  The focus of the event design was how these elements generated 'emotional engagement' and thus affected consumer behavior. Cav. Sorbello worked extensively with the Italian Ministry of Foreign Affairs to develop the festival and collaborated with a wide array of cultural, educational and artistic institutions across Australia to deliver the event.

History

Italian Community in Queensland 

In order to reinvigorate a waning connection within the Queensland’s Italian community in terms of what it is to be Italian, the Italian Government commissioned a yearly festival to be held as a method of communicating the joy and value of all things Italian. In 2007, the Italian Government identified that as a result of Italian’s propensity to identify with regions of Italy rather than with a unified Italy as a whole that Queensland’s Italian community was fragmented and disjointed.

At this time these fragmented entities consisted of 44 registered associations as these people identified themselves as Tuscan’s, Sicilians, and Sardinians etc rather than as Italian’s. The Consulate further identified a disconnect within second and third generation Italians who no longer identified with their Italian heritage. The Italian Ministry of Foreign Affairs proposed a high-level week-long cultural festival be created in Queensland. Specifically developed to dispel out dated stereotypes regarding Italy and to create a platform for cultural and social cohesion. The festival used activities that created emotional engagement with the objective being to unify the Italian community.

Italian Week conveyed Italian culture in a broad sense of the word culture: nationality, country, arts, language and food to mention just a few. It can thus be defined as a ‘Cultural Festival’; a mix of amusement, education, and cultural interaction which triggers identification of the attendees with the Italian culture through experiential meaning, which in turn creates emotional engagement with Italian Week.

Italian Week Featured Artists

Over its 11-year life, Italian Week hosted over 400 events featuring Italian artists such as Andrea Bocelli, Neapolitan-Austrian baritone singer, songwriter, and producer Patrizio Buanne, Rosario La Spina, Lisa Hunt and many others. The festival hosted events in collaboration with the Queensland Performing Arts Centre, Opera Queensland, The Queensland Orchestra, The Queensland Gallery of Modern Art and more.

Italian Week was opened by 2 Italian Ambassadors including His Excellency Mr Stefano Starace Janfolla, Italian Ambassador in Canberra, The Premier of Queensland, two Lord Mayors of Brisbane and the Consul General of Italy.

The Illumination of Superstructures

Commencing in 2009, Italian Week producers developed a concept to create a point of focus for the festival as a means of creating, developing and communicating social identification. Known as the ‘Illumination’, this focus point consists of lighting up key structures in the city of Brisbane in the Italian colors of green, white and red for the duration of Italian Week.  Humans develop and rely upon the interpretation of symbols for social interaction and understanding and the ‘Illumination’ was designed to stimulate and create  emotional engagement’ engendering identity, commitment and pride within the people of Italian heritage in Queensland. A powerful and emotive symbol, the ‘Illumination” was visible for the entire week of the festival and is seen by hundreds of thousands of people.  Historically significant buildings and architectural superstructures have been ‘illuminated’ each year, commencing with the Treasury Casino in 2009 then Brisbane’s iconic Story Bridge in 2011 and in 2012, the Queensland Performing Arts Centre, Queen Victoria Bridge, Kurilpa Bridge and City Hall have all been lit up in the Italian Colours.

The creation of emotional engagement

The festival used as a focal point in creating emotional engagement. The aim of this engagement was developing cultural unity and exploring the role emotions play in the creation of successful festival events for Italians and non-Italians alike.

The success of the festivals use of engagement produced an enhanced sense of cultural unity leading to a yearning to share and repeat the experience among the attendees, as well as communicating to a wider audience increasing both visitors and an appreciation of what it is to be Italian.

Italian Week featured on Qantas in-flight program around Australia and on numerous television shows including the Great South East, Channel 7, RAI international and more. Events in 2015 and 2016 in Brisbane’s New Farm Park attracted record crowds with over 50,000 visitors to the festival in 2015 and 65,000 in 2019.

Academic Research and Publications

Italian Week formed a longitudinal study by Italian Week producer, Cav. Alessandro Sorbello and Dr Eliane Karsaklian, senior professor from the Sorbonne (University of Paris). The research team published eight papers on the festival and defined models for creating emotional engagement and ‘fest-vibe’. In 2016, Sorbello and Karsaklian were awarded International Best Research prize at the University of Florence by the International Academy of Business and Economics.

In 2010, Alessandro Sorbello was awarded an Italian Knighthood for his role as Cultural Attache to the Italian Ministry of Foreign Affairs and for his ground breaking work in promoting Italian culture in the modern context.

References

 Brisbane City Council - Budget 2012/13
 State Library of Queensland
 Sydney Morning Herald
 Minister for Disability Services and Multicultural Affairs
 Lonely Planet
 Brisbane Metropolitan Bands
 The AUSTRALIAN

External links 
Italian Week 2007 Blog
 Italian Week 2008 Blog
 Italian Week 2009 Blog
 Italian Week 2010 Blog
 Italian Week Blog
Consulate of Italy in Brisbane website
New Realm Media website
Italian Week Facebook
Courier Mail

Culture of Brisbane
Italian-Australian culture
Recurring events established in 2007
2007 establishments in Australia
Annual events in Brisbane
Observances in Australia
Autumn events in Australia
Week-long observances